The 2007 Sudirman Cup is the 10th tournament of the World Mixed Team Badminton Championships of Sudirman Cup. It was held from 11 to 17 June 2007 in Glasgow, Scotland.

China won for the sixth time and second in a row after beating Indonesia 3–0 in the final.

Host city selection 
Scotland and South Korea submitted bids to host the event. IBF awarded Scotland the right to host the event during a council meeting in Jakarta.

Venue 
Scotstoun International Sports Arena

Teams 
As confirmed, 48 teams around the world took part in this tournament. (after the retirement of Mongolia) Geographically, they are 31 from Europe, 11 teams from Asia, 3 from Americas, two from Oceania and one from Africa. Below is the seeded the team in each group of the tournament.

Following the withdrawal of Mongolia in Group 7, now that group has been merged with Group 6, the group 6 now has two group itself.

Group stage

Level 1

Group A

Group B

Level 2

Group A

Group B

Level 3

Group A

Group B

Level 4

Group A

Group B

Level 5

Group A

Group B

Level 6

Group A

Group B

Knockout stage

Classification bracket

Classification round 

|-

|-

|-

|-

|-

|-

|-

|-

|-

|-

|-

|-

|-

|-

|-

|-

|-

|-

|-

|-

|-

|-

|}

Final bracket

Semi-finals 

|-

|-

|}

Final 

|-

|}

Final ranking

References

External links
Official website 
Tournamentsoftware.com: 2007 Sudirman Cup

Sudirman Cup
2007 Sudirman Cup
Sudirman Cup
Sudirman Cup
Sudirman Cup
Badminton in Scotland
2000s in Glasgow
International sports competitions in Glasgow